Ballston is a neighborhood in Arlington County, Virginia. Ballston is located at the western end of the Rosslyn-Ballston corridor. It is a major transportation hub and boasts one of the nation's highest concentrations of scientific research agencies, including the Office of Naval Research, Virginia Tech's Advanced Research Institute, and the Air Force Office of Scientific Research.

It is served by the Ballston–MU station on the Orange and Silver Lines of the Washington Metro. By some measures, Ballston is the densest neighborhood in the entire Washington metropolitan area.

History

Ballston is named after the Ball family, one of whose family cemeteries lies in the neighborhood at N. Stafford Street and Fairfax Drive (Virginia State Route 237). Ballston began as Birch's Crossroads, and later became Ball's Crossroads at what is now the intersection of N. Glebe Road and Wilson Boulevard.

A historical marker that stands near the southeastern corner of the intersection reads:

This intersection has been a focal point since about 1740, when two roads were developed, one from the future site of Alexandria to the mouth of Pimmit Run, the other from Awbury’s Ferry (at the site of Rosslyn) to The Falls Church. The first came to be known as the Glebe Road because it passed the glebe of Fairfax Parish and in order to distinguish it from other roads to the Falls. The second was eventually named Wilson Boulevard in honor of President Wilson. The intersection became known as Ball’s Crossroads when Ball’s Tavern was established here in the early 1800s.

In 1896, an interurban electric trolley line, the Fairfax line of the Washington, Arlington and Falls Church Railway (WA&FC), began operating north of the crossroads along the present route of Fairfax Drive, whose name derives from that of the trolleys' final destination, Fairfax City. Construction of the trolley line, which branched at Clarendon to serve both Rosslyn and downtown Washington, D.C., temporarily shifted much of the area's development away from the crossroads. A historical marker that stands near the northwestern corner of Fairfax Drive and N. Stafford Street, one block east of the Ballston Metrorail station (which is at the former site of the Ballston trolley station) states:

By 1900, a well-defined village called Central Ballston had developed in the area bounded by the present-day Wilson Boulevard, Taylor Street, Washington Boulevard, and Pollard Street. More diffuse settlement extended westward to Lubber Run and southward along Glebe Road to Henderson Road.

The track of the Washington, Arlington, and Falls Church Electric Railroad ran along what is now Fairfax Drive; the Ballston Station was at Ballston Avenue, now North Stuart Street. Here Clements Avenue, now Stafford Street, divided to pass on either side of an old Ball family graveyard.

The Ball family burial ground on Washington Boulevard has a historical marker as well, stating:
Old Ball Family Burial Ground.  This is one of Arlington's oldest family burial grounds.  Ensign John Ball (1748–1814), a veteran of the American Revolution (Sixth Virginia Infantry) is buried here.  John Ball was the son of Moses Ball, who was one of the pioneer settlers in the Glencarlyn area of Arlington.  Also buried here in the cemetery are many of John Ball's direct and collateral descendants including John Wesley Boldin, a Civil War soldier (Company D, Third Pennsylvania Cavalry) and members of the Marcey, Stricker, Donaldson, and Croson families.

In 1912, a competing interurban electric trolley line, the Washington and Old Dominion Railway constructed a branch that crossed the WA&FC near the west end of Ballston (then called Lacey), near a WA&FC car barn and railyard. Interstate 66 and the Bluemont Junction Trail now follow the route of this railroad branch between Rosslyn and the Washington and Old Dominion Railroad Regional Park in Bluemont Park. A historical marker entitled "Lacey Car Barn" located near the northwest corner of N. Glebe Road and Faifax Drive states:In 1896, the Washington, Arlington & Falls Church Railway began running electric trolleys from Rosslyn to Falls Church on the present routes of Fairfax Drive and I-66. By 1907, the Fairfax trolley linked Fairfax, Vienna, and Ballston with downtown Washington. In 1910, at this location, the railway built a car barn, railyard, workshops, electrical substation, and general office. In 1912, the rival Washington & Old Dominion Railway began crossing the tracks on a bridge 200 yards west of here, following the present route of I-66 from Rosslyn. The Fairfax trolley closed in 1939, but Metrorail’s Orange Line follows its route through Arlington.

In 1951, the Parkington Shopping Center opened at the intersection formerly known as Balls Crossroads on the site of the present Ballston Quarter. Parkington was anchored by the headquarters location of the Hecht Company, and was reputed to have the largest parking garage in the U.S. when it opened.

Ballston began to redevelop rapidly after the Washington Metropolitan Area Transit Authority opened the Orange Line's Ballston Metrorail station on December 1, 1979, and when an entrance to Interstate 66 (I-66) opened on December 22, 1982. Now highly urbanized, Ballston contains highrise apartment, condominium, and commercial buildings, and a number of bars and restaurants.

Shopping and recreation

Ballston Quarter, a shopping, entertainment and residential complex, reopened in 2019 after being closed for two years of renovations.

The MedStar Capitals Iceplex, constructed on top of the Ballston Quarter parking garage, houses a Washington Capitals National Hockey League (NHL) office and training facility. In addition to the ice hockey team's  training center, the Iceplex features two indoor NHL-sized ice rinks, office space, locker rooms, a full-service pro-shop, a Capitals team store, a snack bar, and space for special events. The facility provides public skating, figure skating, and hockey programs for youths and adults.

Ballston hosts the annual Taste of Arlington food festival, a street fair which has been produced each spring since 1987. The 2009 Taste of Arlington event featured over 40 area restaurants offering portions of their cuisine to ticket-holders, and drew approximately 15,000 people. The regional business development organization, the Ballston Business Improvement District (Ballston BID), (formerly the Ballston-Virginia Square Partnership), other area community development organizations, and the National Science Foundation organize the festival. Ticket sales at the event raise funds for area charities.

Economy
Major employers in Ballston.

 The Defense Advanced Research Projects Agency (DARPA)
 The Nature Conservancy
 The Office of Naval Research
 The DHS National Protection and Programs Directorate
 Navy-Marine Corps Relief Society
 National Rural Electric Cooperative Association (NRECA)
 National Highway Institute 
 Software Engineering Institute 
 CACI International
 E*Trade
 AvalonBay Communities 
 Evolent Health
 WeWork
 Industrious
 Booz Allen Hamilton
 Applied Predictive Technologies 
 Privia Health
 Prudential 
 Willis Towers Watson
 Deloitte 
 Accenture(HQ)

In 2011, Accenture agreed to move its offices from Reston, Virginia to a new  facility in Ballston.

Education
The neighborhood is home to Washington-Liberty High School.
Ballston is also home to several university facilities, including:
 A Marymount University (MU) satellite campus. 
In January 2014, the Arlington County Board approved MU's site plan application to redevelop the campus with two new buildings, a nine-story office and educational building for Marymount University and a 15-story multifamily building with 272 residential units, by Arlington developer, the Shooshan Company.  The new campus opened in August 2017.

 A Virginia Tech research center.
 A George Washington University graduate education center.

Notes

External links

Why Is It Named Ballston?
Ballston Metro Station Area Data, Statistics and Development
Washington Post article about Ballston from February 18th, 2007
Arlington's Urban Villages – Ballston
MedStar Capitals Iceplex
Taste of Arlington

Neighborhoods in Arlington County, Virginia
Transit-oriented developments in the United States
Edge cities in the Baltimore-Washington metropolitan area